The Women's 12.5 kilometre mass start biathlon competition of the Sochi 2014 Olympics was held at Laura Biathlon & Ski Complex on 17 February 2014.

Results
The race was started at 19:00.

On 27 November 2017, IOC disqualified Olga Vilukhina for doping violations.

References

Mass start